Fred Meyer Jewelers is a national chain of jewelers.  It is a wholly owned subsidiary of Fred Meyer and Kroger. The company also operates under the name Littman Jewelers.

History

Fred Meyer Jewelers started in 1973 as a catalog showroom concept by Fred G. Meyer. As the catalog showroom fad started to die down, Fred Meyer was experiencing excellent sales growth in the fine jewelry category. To capitalize on this sales growth, Fred Meyer placed fine jewelry stores in their large multi-department stores and eventually shopping malls throughout the Western United States.

In 1995, Fred Meyer Jewelers acquired 23 jewelers in California and the Midwestern United States, as well as Merksamer Jewelers.  Eventually all of those acquisitions took the name Fred Meyer Jewelers.

In 1997, Fred Meyer Jewelers acquired the chain of Fox's Jewelers that operated in six Midwestern states. Fox's Jewelers were eventually renamed Fred Meyer Jewelers.

In October 1998, Fred Meyer Jewelers acquired the Littman Jewelers chain that operates in the eastern United States. Unlike other acquisitions, Littman stores continue to operate under this name instead of Fred Meyer Jewelers. In 1999 Fred Meyer, Inc., the parent company of Fred Meyer Jewelers, was acquired by The Kroger Company. Today, Fred Meyer Jewelers operates across the United States in stores, in malls, and online. The corporate main office is located in Portland, Oregon.

References

External links
 
 kroger.com
 littmanjewelers.com

Kroger
American companies established in 1973
Retail companies established in 1973
Jewelry retailers of the United States
1973 establishments in Oregon